The 1982 Columbia Lions football team was an American football team that represented Columbia University during the 1982 NCAA Division I-AA football season. Columbia finished last in the Ivy League. 

In their third season under head coach Bob Naso, the Lions compiled a 1–9 record and were outscored 390 to 236. Jim Davin and Mike Scavina were the team captains.  

The Lions' 1–6 conference record was the worst in the Ivy League standings. Columbia was outscored 254 to 180 by Ivy opponents. 

This was Columbia's first year in Division I-AA, after having competed in the top-level Division I-A and its predecessors since 1870.

Columbia played its home games at Baker Field in Upper Manhattan, in New York City. This was the final year for Baker Field, which had hosted Columbia football since 1923. Following Baker Field's demolition, Columbia built Lawrence A. Wien Stadium, its current football home, on the same site.

Schedule

References

Columbia
Columbia Lions football seasons
Columbia Lions football